Meredith Kolodner is an American journalist, and staff writer for the Hechinger Report. She won The Sidney Award for 2019.

Life
She graduated from Brown University and Columbia University School of Journalism.
She worked for the New York Daily News, InsideSchools.org and The Investigative Fund of The Nation Institute.

Her work has appeared in the Atlantic, New York Times, WNYC, Washington Monthly and PBS Newshour.

References

External links
 Meredith Kolodner, Lauren Zumbach, WGN Wintrust Business Lunch 12/29/18

Living people
American women journalists
Year of birth missing (living people)
21st-century American journalists
21st-century American women writers
Brown University alumni
Columbia University Graduate School of Journalism alumni
New York Daily News people